Collective memory refers to the shared pool of memories, knowledge and information of a social group that is significantly associated with the group's identity. The English phrase "collective memory" and the equivalent French phrase "la mémoire collective" appeared in the second half of the nineteenth century. The philosopher and sociologist Maurice Halbwachs analyzed and advanced the concept of the collective memory in the book Les cadres sociaux de la mémoire (1925). Collective memory can be constructed, shared, and passed on by large and small social groups. Examples of these groups can include nations, generations, communities, among others. Collective memory has been a topic of interest and research across a number of disciplines, including psychology, sociology, history, philosophy, and anthropology.

Conceptualization of collective memory

Attributes of collective memory 
Collective memory has been conceptualized in several ways and proposed to have certain attributes. For instance, collective memory can refer to a shared body of knowledge (e.g., memory of a nation's past leaders or presidents); the image, narrative, values and ideas of a social group; or the continuous process by which collective memories of events change.

History versus collective memory 
The difference between history and collective memory is best understood when comparing the aims and characteristics of each. A goal of history broadly is to provide a comprehensive, accurate, and unbiased portrayal of past events. This often includes the representation and comparison of multiple perspectives and the integration of these perspectives and details to provide a complete and accurate account. In contrast, collective memory focuses on a single perspective, for instance, the perspective of one social group, nation, or community. Consequently, collective memory represents past events as associated with the values, narratives and biases specific to that group.

Studies have found that people from different nations can have major differences in their recollections of the past. In one study where American and Russian students were instructed to recall significant events from World War II and these lists of events were compared, the majority of events recalled by the American and Russian students were not shared. Differences in the events recalled and emotional views towards the Civil War, World War II and the Iraq War have also been found in a study comparing collective memory between generations of Americans.

Perspectives on collective memory 
The concept of collective memory, initially developed by Halbwachs, has been explored and expanded from various angles – a few of these are introduced below.

James E. Young has introduced the notion of 'collected memory' (opposed to collective memory), marking memory's inherently fragmented, collected and individual character, while Jan Assmann develops the notion of 'communicative memory', a variety of collective memory based on everyday communication. This form of memory is similar to the exchanges in an oral culture or the memories collected (and made collective) through oral history. As another subform of collective memories Assmann mentions forms detached from the everyday; it can be particular materialized and fixed points as, e.g. texts and monuments.

The theory of collective memory was also discussed by former Hiroshima resident and atomic bomb survivor, Kiyoshi Tanimoto, in his tour of the United States as an attempt to rally support and funding for the reconstruction of his Memorial Methodist Church in Hiroshima. He theorized that the use of the atomic bomb had forever been added to the world's collective memory and would serve in the future as a warning against such devices. See John Hersey's Hiroshima novel.

Historian Guy Beiner, an authority on memory and history on Ireland, has criticized  the unreflective use of the adjective "collective" in many studies of memory:  In its place, Beiner has promoted the term "social memory" and has also demonstrated its limitations by developing a related concept of "social forgetting".

Historian David Rieff takes issue with the term "collective memory", distinguishing between memories of people who were actually alive during the events in question, and people who only know about them from culture or media. Rieff writes in opposition to George Santayana's aphorism "those who cannot remember the past are condemned to repeat it", pointing out that strong cultural emphasis on certain historical events (often wrongs against the group) can prevent resolution of armed conflicts, especially when the conflict has been previously fought to a draw. The sociologist David Leupold draws attention to the problem of structural nationalism inherent in the notion of collective memory, arguing in favor of "emancipating the notion of collective memory from being subjected to the national collective" by employing a multi-collective perspective that highlights the mutual interaction of other memory collectives that form around generational belonging, family, locality or socio-political world views.

Pierre Levy argues that the phenomenon of human collective intelligence undergoes a profound shift with the arrival of the internet paradigm, as it allows the vast majority of humanity to access and modify a common shared online collective memory.

Collective memory and psychological research 
Though traditionally a topic studied in the humanities, collective memory has become an area of interest in psychology. Common approaches taken in psychology to study collective memory have included investigating the cognitive mechanisms involved in the formation and transmission of collective memory; and comparing the social representations of history between social groups.

Social representations of history 
Research on collective memory have taken the approach to compare how different social groups form their own representations of history and how such collective memories can impact ideals, values, behaviors and vice versa.  Developing social identity and evaluating the past in order to prevent past patterns of conflict and errors are proposed functions of why groups form social representations of history. This research has focused on surveying  different groups or comparing differences in recollections of historical events, such as the examples given earlier when comparing history and collective memory.

Differences in collective memories between social groups, such as nations or states, have been attributed to collective narcissism and egocentric/ethnocentric bias. In one related study where participants from 35 countries were questioned about their country's contribution to world history and provided a percentage estimation from 0% to 100%, evidence for collective narcissism was found as many countries gave responses exaggerating their country's contribution. In another study where American's from the 50 states were asked similar questions regarding their state's contribution to the history of the United States, patterns of overestimation and collective narcissism were also found.

Cognitive mechanisms underlying collaborative recall
Certain cognitive mechanisms involved during group recall and the interactions between these mechanisms have been suggested to contribute to the formation of collective memory. Below are some mechanisms involved during when groups of individuals recall collaboratively.

Collaborative inhibition and retrieval disruption
When groups collaborate to recall information, they experience collaborative inhibition, a decrease in performance compared to the pooled memory recall of an equal number of individuals. Weldon and Bellinger (1997) and Basden, Basden, Bryner, and Thomas (1997) provided evidence that retrieval interference underlies collaborative inhibition, as hearing other members' thoughts and discussion about the topic at hand interferes with one's own organization of thoughts and impairs memory.

The main theoretical account for collaborative inhibition is retrieval disruption. During the encoding of information, individuals form their own idiosyncratic organization of the information. This organization is later used when trying to recall the information. In a group setting as members exchange information, the information recalled by group members disrupts the idiosyncratic organization one had developed. As each member's organization is disrupted, this results in the less information recalled by the group compared to the pooled recall of participants who had individually recalled (an equal number of participants as in the group).

Despite the problem of collaborative inhibition, working in groups may benefit an individual's memory in the long run, as group discussion exposes one to many different ideas over time. Working alone initially prior to collaboration seems to be the optimal way to increase memory.

Early speculations about collaborative inhibition have included explanations, such as diminished personal accountability, social loafing and the diffusion of responsibility, however retrieval disruption remains the leading explanation. Studies have found that collective inhibition to sources other than social loafing, as offering a monetary incentive have been evidenced to fail to produce an increase in memory for groups. Further evidence from this study suggest something other than social loafing is at work, as reducing evaluation apprehension – the focus on one's performance amongst other people – assisted in individuals' memories but did not produce a gain in memory for groups. Personal accountability – drawing attention to one's own performance and contribution in a group – also did not reduce collaborative inhibition. Therefore, group members' motivation to overcome the interference of group recall cannot be achieved by several motivational factors.

Cross-cueing
Information exchange among group members often helps individuals to remember things that they would not have remembered had they been working alone. In other words, the information provided by person A may 'cue' memories in person B. This results in enhanced recall. During a group recall, an individual might not remember as much as they would on their own, as their memory recall cues may be distorted because of other team members. Nevertheless, this has enhanced benefits, team members can remember something specific to the disruption of the group. Cross-cueing plays a role in formulation of group recall (Barber, 2011).

Collective false memories

In 2010, a study was done to see how individuals remembered a bombing that occurred in the 1980s.  The clock was later set at 10.25 to remember the tragic bomb (de Vito et al. 2009). The individuals were asked to remember if the clock at Bologna central station in Italy had remained functioning, everyone said no, in fact it was the opposite (Legge, 2018). There have been many instances in history where people create a false memory. In a 2003 study done in the Claremont Graduate University, results demonstrated that during a stressful event and the actual event are managed by the brain differently. Other instances of false memories may occur when remembering something on an object that is not actually there or mistaking how someone looks in a crime scene (Legge, 2018). It is possible for people to remember the same false memories; some people call it the “Mandela effect”. The name “Mandela effect” comes from the name of South African civil rights leader Nelson Mandela whom many people falsely believed was dead. (Legge, 2018). The Pandora Box experiment explains that language complexes the mind more when it comes to false memories. Language plays a role with imaginative experiences, because it makes it hard for humans to gather correct information (Jablonka, 2017).

Error pruning
Compared to recalling individually, group members can provide opportunities for error pruning during recall to detect errors that would otherwise be uncorrected by an individual.

Social contagion errors
Group settings can also provide opportunities for exposure to erroneous information that may be mistaken to be correct or previously studied.

Re-exposure effects
Listening to group members recall the previously encoded information can enhance memory as it provides a second exposure opportunity to the information.

Forgetting
Studies have shown that information forgotten and excluded during group recall can promote the forgetting of related information compared to information unrelated to that which was excluded during group recall. Selective forgetting has been suggested to be a critical mechanism involved in the formation of collective memories and what details are ultimately included and excluded by group members. This mechanism has been studied using the socially-shared retrieval induced forgetting paradigm, a variation of the retrieval induced forgetting method with individuals. The brain has many important brain regions that are directed at memory, the cerebral cortex, the fornix and the structures that they contain. These structures in the brain are required for attaining new information, and if any of these structures are damaged you can get anterograde or retrograde amnesia (Anastasio et al.,p. 26, 2012). Amnesia could be anything that disrupts your memory or affects you psychologically. Over time, memory loss becomes a natural part of amnesia. Sometimes you can get retrograde memory of a recent or past event.

Synchronization of memories from dyads to networks 
Bottom-up approaches to the formation of collective memories investigate how cognitive-level phenomena allow for people to synchronize their memories following conversational remembering. Due to the malleability of human memory, talking with one another about the past results in memory changes that increase the similarity between the interactional partners' memories When these dyadic interactions occur in a social network, one can understand how large communities converge on a similar memory of the past. Research on larger interactions show that collective memory in larger social networks can emerge due to cognitive mechanisms involved in small group interactions.

Computational approaches to collective memory analysis 
With the ability of online data such as social media and social network data and developments in natural language processing as well as information retrieval it has become possible to study how online users refer to the past and what they focus at. In an early study in 2010 researchers extracted absolute year references from large amounts of news articles collected for queries denoting particular countries. This allowed to portray so-called memory curves that demonstrate which years are particularly strongly remembered in the context of different countries (commonly, exponential shape of memory curves with occasional peaks that relate to commemorating important past events) and how the attention to more distant years declines in news. Based on a topic modelling and analysis they then detected major topics portraying how particular years are remembered. Rather than news Wikipedia was also the target of analysis. Viewership statistics of Wikipedia articles on aircraft crashes were analyzed to study the relation between recent events and past events, particularly for understanding memory-triggering patterns.
Other studies focused on the analysis of collective memory in social networks such as investigation of over 2 million tweets (both quantitively and qualitatively) that are related to history to uncover their characteristics and ways in which history-related content is disseminated in social networks. Hashtags, as well as tweets, can be classified into the following types:

 General History hashtags used in general to broadly identify history-related tweets that do not fall into any specific type (e.g., #history, #historyfacts).
 National or Regional History hashtags which relate to national or regional histories, for example, #ushistory or #canadianhistory including also past names of locations (e.g., #ancientgreece).
 Facet-focused History hashtags which relate to particular thematic facets of history (e.g.,#sporthistory, #arthistory).
 General Commemoration hashtags that serve for commemorating or recalling a certain day or period (often somehow related to the day of tweet posting), or unspecified entities, such as #todaywe remember, #otd, #onthisday, #4yearsago and #rememberthem.
 Historical Events hashtags related to particular events in the past (e.g., #wwi, #sevenyearswar).
 Historical Entities hashtags denoting references to specific entities such as persons, organizations or objects (e.g., #stalin, #).

See also 

 Collective consciousness
 Collective intelligence
 Collective unconscious
 Cultural memory
 Digital preservation, Web archiving
 Distributed cognition

 Les Lieux de Mémoire
 Meme
 National memory
 Oral history

 Selective omission – biases to taboo some elements of a collective memory

References

Further reading

General studies
Jan Assmann: Religion and Cultural Memory: Ten Studies, Stanford UP 2005
Jeffrey Andrew Barash, Collective Memory and the Historical Past, Chicago and London, University of Chicago Press, 2016.
Maurice Halbwachs: On Collective Memory, Univ of Chicago Press, 1992, 
Pennebaker, James W. Paez, Dario. Rime, Bernard: Collective memory of political events : social psychological perspectives, Mahwah, New Jersey. Lawrence Erlbaum Associates: 1997.
Amy Corning & Howard Schuman: Generations and Collective Memory, Chicago: University of Chicago Press, 2015.

Case studies
 Bayer, Yaakov M. (2016). Memory and belonging: The social construction of a collective memory during the intercultural transition of immigrants from Argentina in Israel. Journal of Multidisciplinary Research, 8(1), 5-27.
 
 
 Cole, Jennifer: Forget colonialism? : sacrifice and the art of memory in Madagascar, Berkeley [etc.] : Univ. of California Press, 2001  
 Fitsch, Matthias: The Promise of Memory: History and Politics in Marx, Benjamin, and Derrida, State University of New York Press, 2006
 Lipsitz, George: Time Passages : Collective Memory and American Popular Culture, Minneapolis. University of Minnesota Press: 2001.
 Neal, Arthur G.: National Trauma and Collective Memory: Major Events in the American Century. Armonk, N.Y. M.E. Sharpe: 1998
 Olick, Jeffrey K.: The Politics of Regret: On Collective Memory and Historical Responsibility, Routledge, 2007
 Olick, Jeffrey K.: In the House of the Hangman: The Agonies of German Defeat,1943-1949, University of Chicago Press, 2005.
 
 Tillack-Graf, Anne-Kathleen (2012): Erinnerungspolitik der DDR. Dargestellt an der Berichterstattung der Tageszeitung „Neues Deutschland“ über die Nationalen Mahn- und Gedenkstätten Buchenwald, Ravensbrück und Sachsenhausen. Frankfurt am Main: Peter Lang. ISBN 978-3-631-63678-7.

Handbooks
Olick, Jeffrey K., Vered Vinitzky-Seroussi, and Daniel Levy, eds.  The Collective Memory Reader.  Oxford University Press: 2011.
Prucha, Francis Paul.  Handbook for Research in American History: A Guide to Bibliographies and Other Reference Works. University of Nebraska Press: 1987
Encyclopedia of American Social History. Ed. Mary Clayton et al. 3 vols. New York: Scribner, 1993.
Blazek, Ron and Perrault, Anna. United States History: A Selective Guide to Information Sources. Englewood, Colorado. Libraries Unlimited: 1994
Erll, Astrid and Nünning, Ansgar. A Companion to Cultural Memory Studies. Walter De Gruyter. 2010.

Computational approaches

Psychological approaches

 Choi, H. Y., Blumen, H. M., Congleton, A. R., & Rajaram, S. (2014). The role of group configuration in the social transmission of memory: Evidence from identical and reconfigured groups. Journal of Cognitive Psychology, 26 (1), 65–80.
 Coman, A. (2015). The psychology of collective memory. In: James D. Wright (editor-in-chief), International Encyclopedia of the Social & Behavioral Sciences (2nd Ed.), Vol. 4, Oxford: Elsevier. pp. 188–193.
 Coman, A. & Momennejad, I, Geana, A, Drach, D.R. (2016). Mnemonic convergence in social networks: the emergent properties of cognition at a collective level. Proceedings of the National Academy of Sciences, 113 (29), 8171–8176.
 Congleton, A. R., & Rajaram, S. (2014). Collaboration changes both the content and the structure of memory: Building the architecture of shared representations. Journal of Experimental Psychology: General, 143 (4), 1570–1584.
 Hirst W., Manier D. (2008). Towards a psychology of collective memory. Memory, 16, 183–200.
 Hirst, W., Yamashiro, J., Coman, A. (2018). Collective memory from a psychological perspective. Trends in Cognitive Sciences, 22 (5), 438–451.
 Licata, Laurent and Mercy, Aurélie: Collective memory (Social psychology of), International Encyclopedia of the Social & Behavioral Sciences, 2nd edition. Elsevier. 2015.
 Wertsch, J. V., & Roediger, H. L. (2008). Collective memory: Conceptual foundations and theoretical approaches. Memory, 16(3), 318–326.
 Rajaram, S., & Pereira-Pasarin, L. P. (2010). Collaborative memory: Cognitive research and theory. Perspectives on Psychological Science, 5(6), 649–663.
 Roediger, H. L., & Abel, M. (2015). Collective memory: A new arena of cognitive study. Trends in Cognitive Sciences, 19(7), 359–361.
 Weldon, M. S., & Bellinger, K. D. (1997). Collective memory: Collaborative and individual processes in remembering. Journal of Experimental Psychology: Learning, Memory, and Cognition, 23(5), 1160–1175.

External links 
  For a Sociology of Collective Memory short discussion with bibliography of French works by Marie-Claire Lavabre, Research Director at CNRS – Centre Marc Bloch (CEVIPOF)
  Interdisciplinary Study of Memory Site  by John Sutton, Philosophy Department, Macquarie University, Sydney. Links to many bibliographies
  "History in the Public Sphere: Analyzing Collective Memory" course by Harold Marcuse, History Department, University of California, Santa Barbara. With bibliography and links to readings.

Memory
Collective intelligence
Sociology of knowledge